Ashtiani (آشتیانی) is one of the Northwestern Iranian languages, spoken in Ashtiyan and Tafresh of Iran.

It is sometimes seen as a transitional dialect between Northwestern Iranian languages and Talysh and is very close to Vafsi. Its speakers are also bilingual in Persian.

References

Western Iranian languages